Tomaso Luis Volpi (born 5 December 1920), also known as Tommaso Volpi, Tomás Volpi or Luis Volpi, is a Uruguayan retired professional footballer. He was born in Artigas. He made 11 appearances for the Uruguay national team.

Honours
 Primera División (Uruguay) champion: 1939, 1940, 1941, 1946.

References

External links
 

1920 births
Possibly living people
People from Artigas Department
Uruguayan footballers
Uruguay international footballers
Club Nacional de Football players
Montevideo Wanderers F.C. players
Uruguayan expatriate footballers
Expatriate footballers in Italy
Uruguayan Primera División players
Serie A players
Inter Milan players
Association football midfielders